The 2012 Clipsal 500 was a motor race for the Australian sedan-based V8 Supercars. It was the first event of the 2012 International V8 Supercars Championship, and the fourteenth running of the Clipsal 500. It was held on the weekend of 1–4 March at the Adelaide Street Circuit, in Adelaide, South Australia.

Report

Race 1

Qualifying 
Triple Eight Race Engineering driver Craig Lowndes qualified on pole position for the first race — his pole at the Adelaide parklands circuit — ahead of Garth Tander and Will Davison. Lowndes' team-mate and reigning series champion Jamie Whincup qualified fifth, having started on the front row of the grid at every race since 2007.

Notes
 – Michael Patrizi was moved to the back of the grid for ignoring red flags during qualifying.

Race 
Garth Tander took an early lead in the race, but was re-passed by Craig Lowndes after three drivers — James Courtney, Jason Bright and Taz Douglas — crashed heavily at Turn 8. Shortly after the accident Jamie Whincup switched from a two-stop to a three-stop strategy as Will Davison took the lead of the race, leading team-mate Mark Winterbottom. David Reynolds also crashed at Turn 8 just before lap 50, prompting an early round of pit stops and forcing the leaders to enter fuel-saving mode. Whincup used his shorter fuelling window and a brand-new set of tyres to catch the leaders, passing Davison at the hairpin on the final lap when Davison ran out of fuel. Tander finished third after Winterbottom was forced to pit for fuel himself.

Notes
 — Alexandre Prémat and Jason Bright started the race from pit lane.

Race 2

Qualifying 
After missing pole position for Race 1, Jamie Whincup claimed his first pole of the season, beating Garth Tander by one-tenth of a second. The twenty-minute qualifying session saw a heavy collision between Greg Murphy and Jonathon Webb when Webb slowed on the approach to the final corner, attempting to create a window of clean air for a flying lap. Murphy, already on a flying lap himself, came around the penultimate corner at speed and was unable to move aside in time, rear-ending Webb's car. The accident was heavy enough to remove both cars out of the race.

Notes
 – James Courtney failed to set a lap time after damaging his gearbox.

Race 
Garth Tander lead the race away once again, but was caught and passed by Jamie Whincup before the first round of stops, and then the Fords of Will Davison and Mark Winterbottom after the stops. Whincup's car was reported to develop a misfire and was soon caught by Davison and Winterbottom, who also went on to pass Tander. The race was uninterrupted by safety cars, and Davison and Winterbottom went on to claim a one-two finish for Ford Performance Racing.

Notes
 — James Courtney started the race from pit lane.

Standings
 After 2 of 30 races.

References

Adelaide 500
Clipsal
2010s in Adelaide